Vladimir Petrovich Frolov (1967 – 10 March 2022) was a Russian major general who died during the 2022 Russian invasion of Ukraine.

Biography
Vladimir Frolov was born into the family of a World War II veteran. He was promoted to the rank of major general by Presidential Decree No. 595 of Vladimir Putin on 12 December 2019.

The 8th Guards Combined Arms Army, whose deputy commander was Frolov, was actively engaged in the siege of Mariupol. According to Tsargrad TV, he died no earlier than 11 April 2022.

His death was announced by Russian officials on 16 April 2022. The same day, his burial was held with military honours at Saint Petersburg's Serafimovskoe Cemetery after a funeral service in Novocherkassk's Ascension Cathedral. The ceremony was attended by the Governor of Saint Petersburg, Alexander Beglov.

Awards

See also 
 List of Russian generals killed during the 2022 invasion of Ukraine

References

Place of birth missing
1967 births
2022 deaths
Burials at Serafimovskoe Cemetery
Russian major generals
Russian military personnel killed in the 2022 Russian invasion of Ukraine